Wilton Gomes (born 30 October 1980) is a retired Indian professional footballer who last played for Sporting Clube de Goa in the I-League as a midfielder.

External links
 http://goal.com/en-india/people/india/25971/wilton-gomes

1980 births
Living people
Indian footballers
Sporting Clube de Goa players
I-League players
Footballers from Goa
Association football midfielders